İbrahim Kalın (born September 15, 1971) is a Turkish bureaucrat and Islamic studies scholar. In 2018, he was appointed as deputy chairman of the Security and Foreign Policy Council of Turkish Presidency and chief adviser to the President of Turkey, Recep Tayyip Erdoğan.  He currently serves as the presidential spokesperson and special adviser to the President of Turkey, Recep Tayyip Erdoğan.

Education and academic career
Kalın received his B.A. from the University of Istanbul and Ph.D. from George Washington University under the supervision of Islamic philosopher Seyyed Hossein Nasr. From 2002 to 2005 he was a faculty member at the Department of Religious Studies at the College of the Holy Cross in Worcester, Massachusetts. He is a founding member and former director (2005–2009) of the SETA Foundation for Political, Economic and Social Research based in Ankara, Turkey.

Bureaucratic career 

He became the first coordinator of the Prime Ministry Public Diplomacy Coordinatorship established in January 2010. In 2012, he became Deputy Undersecretary of the Prime Ministry. On December 11, 2014, President Recep Tayyip Erdoğan announced that İbrahim Kalın would be the first official Turkish Presidential Press Secretary. In November 2018, he was appointed as Chief Adviser to Erdogan.

Personal life 
His parents are from İspir, Erzurum. He is married and has 3 children. His hobbies include music, especially folk music. He professionally plays the bağlama, sings and has music on YouTube with millions of views.

Selected works 

As author

 Knowledge as Light. Critical Remarks on M. Hairi Yazdi's Principles of Epistemology in Islamic Philosophy: Knowledge by Presence. In: American Journal of Islamic and Social Sciences. Vol. 16 (1999), pp. 85–97 (online).
Islam and the West, 2007 (2007 Writers Association of Turkey award for best book)
 Knowledge in later Islamic philosophy. Mullā Ṣadrā on existence, intellect, and intuition. Oxford University Press, Oxford 2010.
 Islam in Turkey. Oxford Bibliographies Online Research Guide. Oxford University Press, Oxford 2010.

As editor

 with John L. Esposito: The 500 Most Influential Muslims annual, Amman, Jordan: Royal Islamic Strategic Studies Centre, 1st edition, 2009.
 with John L. Esposito: Islamophobia. The Challenge of Pluralism in the 21st Century. Oxford University Press, Oxford 2011.
The Oxford Encyclopedia of Philosophy, Science, and Technology in Islam, Oxford University Press, 2014.

As contributor

MacMillan Encyclopedia of Philosophy 2nd Edition
MacMillan Encyclopedia of Religion 2nd Edition
Biographical Encyclopedia of Islamic Philosophy
Oxford Encyclopedia of the Islamic World

References

    8.^İbrahim Kalın discusses the possibilities in the World after the Coronavirus PandemicYoutube Apr 2020 Retrieved May 2020

External links

 Column archives at Daily Sabah Newspaper
 Column archives at Yeni Şafak

1971 births
Living people
Writers from Istanbul
Istanbul University alumni
George Washington University alumni
College of the Holy Cross faculty
Center for Contemporary Arab Studies faculty
Islamic studies scholars
Muslim scholars of Islamic studies